Stellar explosion can refer to:

 Nova
 Kilonova
 Micronova
 Supernova
 Type Ia supernova
 Type Ib and Ic supernovae
 Type II supernova
 Superluminous supernova
 Pair-instability supernova
 Hypernova
 Supernova impostor, stellar explosions that appear similar to supernova, but do not destroy their progenitor stars
 Failed supernova
 Luminous red nova, an explosion thought to be caused by stellar collision
 Solar flares are a minor type of stellar explosion
 Tidal disruption event, the pulling apart of a star by tidal forces

References

Stellar phenomena